Lawrence is a center of media in northeastern Kansas. The following is a list of media outlets based in the city.

Print

Newspapers
The Lawrence Journal-World is the city's primary newspaper, published daily. In addition, the University of Kansas publishes a student newspaper, the University Daily Kansan, twice a week in print and continuously online at kansan.com during the school year and weekly during the summer.

Radio
Due to Lawrence's proximity to both Topeka and Kansas City, local listeners can receive the signal of radio stations broadcasting from both cities' markets.

The following stations are licensed to and/or broadcast from Lawrence:

AM

FM

Television
Lawrence lies within the Kansas City television market. Due to Lawrence's proximity to Topeka, local viewers can also receive the signal of several television stations broadcasting in the Topeka television market.

The following is a list of stations licensed to and/or broadcasting from Lawrence:

References

Mass media in Kansas